Trudy Erwin (born August 12, 1918 – October 29, 2000) was an American singer and actress in films who was a vocalist with the Kay Kyser orchestra in the 1940s. She recorded several hit songs including the 1943 duets with Bing Crosby "People Will Say We're In Love (#1) and "Oh! What A Beautiful Mornin' (#4).

References

External links
 

1918 births
2000 deaths
20th-century American singers
20th-century American women singers
American women jazz singers
American jazz singers
Decca Records artists
Musicians from Los Angeles
People from Los Angeles
Singers from California